Casco Art Institute: Working for the Commons is a non-profit public art institution based in Utrecht, Netherlands.

Overview 
Casco was founded in 1990 as an experimental art space on the Oudegracht in Utrecht. In 1995 it was renamed Casco Projects, starting a program with a focus on autonomy and intervention. In 2003, Casco took a new title 'Office for Art, Design and Theory' to expand its framework to artistic research and interdisciplinary practices. In 2007, the institute moved to a new location on the Nieuwekade, designed by ifau (institute for applied urbanism) and Jesko Fezer. In 2014 Casco moved to a new space on the Lange Nieuwstraat in Utrecht. 2018 marked another transitional year accompanied by the name change to Casco Art Institute: Working for the Commons.

Past projects 
2018 Elephants in The Room: Assembly for commoning institutions
2018 Biannual exhibition program: Alma Heikkilä, "Evolved in shared relationships" and The Outsiders "Erfgoed (Agricultural Heritage and Land Use)"
2017 Doria Garía and Ingo Niermann "Army of Love", and Heman Chong and Renée Staal, "The Library of Unread Books"
2016 Alex Martinis Roe, "To Become Two"
2016 Wok The Rock, "Parasite Lottery"
2015 Group Exhibition: "We Are the Time Machines: Time and Tools for Commoning"
2015 Adelita Husni-Bey, "White Paper: The Law" and Fernano Garcìa-Dory, "INLAND"
2014 Melanie Gilligan, "The Common Sense" and The Otolith Group, "In the Year of the Quiet Sun" 
2014 Wendelien van Oldenborgh receives prestigious Dr AH Heiniken Prize for Art
2014 Inaugural Exhibition, "New Habits"
2013 Tadasu Takamine, "Japan Syndrome - Utrecht Version"
2012 Lawrence Abu Hamdan, "Aural Contract: The Whole Truth"
2009-2010 "User's Manual: The Grand Domestic Revolution", long-term "living research",
2010 Ei Arakawa, "Hurt Locker Instruments"
2010 Martha Rosler, "If you Lived Here Still..."
2009 Metahaven, "Stadtstaadt. A Scenario for Merging Cities"
2008 Fritz Haeg, "Animal Estates 6.0"
2008 Ricardo Basbaum, "Re-projecting (Utrecht)"
2008 Stephen Willats, "The Speculative Diagram"
2007 Dave Hullfish Bailey, "What's left for its own devices (on reclamation)"
2007 Annette Krauss, "Hidden Curriculum"

Publications 
 1996 Casco Issues 1: Good & Bad
 1997 Casco Issues 2: Parallel Worlds
1997 Casco Issues 3
1998 Casco Issues 4: The black-and-white issue
1999 Casco Issues 5: Real Experiments
 2007 The So-called Utopia
 2007 Hidden Curriculum Files, Annette Krauss
 2011 A Well Respected Man, Van Oldenborgh, Wendelien, in collaboration with Sternberg Press
 2014 The Grand Domestic Revolution Handbook

See also 
 List of contemporary art spaces in the Netherlands

References

External links 
 

Contemporary art galleries in the Netherlands
Art museums and galleries in the Netherlands